Jimmy Shields may refer to:

 Jimmy Shields (baseball) (1905–1963), American Negro league baseball player
 Jimmy Shields (curler) (1929–1996), Canadian curler, 1968 World champion
 Jimmy Shields (footballer) (1931–2020), for Southampton and Northern Ireland
 Jimmy Shields (journalist) (1900–1949), British communist activist and newspaper editor
 Jimmie Shields, the longtime companion of William Haines

See also 
 James Shields (disambiguation)